"TQG" (acronym for "Te Quedó Grande") is a song by Colombian singer-songwriters Karol G and Shakira. The song was released on February 24, 2023, through Universal Music Latino, as the fifth single from Karol G's fourth studio album, Mañana Será Bonito.

Background 
First rumours of a Karol G and Shakira collaboration started circulating in January 2023. On February 14, Shakira wished Karol G a happy birthday on social media similar to how she did for her previous collaboration with Bizarrap for volume 53 of his music sessions. The song was reported to contain messages to their ex-boyfriends, Anuel AA and Gerard Piqué.

Release and promotion 
On February 21, 2023, Karol G officially revealed the song to be a collaboration with Shakira, despite having previously revealed that there would be no feature on the track. That same day, Giraldo announced that she had a surprise for her fans in New York's Times Square which would turn out to be a teaser for the music video.

Critical reception 
Alexis Petridis of The Guardian commended the ethereal atmosphere that "TQG" has "though frankly it’s a bit phoned-in." Ernesto Lechner from Rolling Stone called the song "underwhelming", stating "her much-anticipated track with Colombian icon Shakira, "TQG," feels underwhelming, especially since it arrives only weeks after the media circus that surrounded Shakira’s massive new track with Bizarrap."

Commercial performance 
"TQG" debuted at number 7 on the US Billboard Hot 100 chart dated March 11, 2023, becoming Karol G's first and Shakira's sixth top ten on the chart.

On the US Billboard Hot Latin Songs the song debuted atop the chart, becoming Karol's sixth and Shakira's thirteen number one on the chart.

On the Billboard Global 200 the song also debuted atop the charts on the week dated March 11, 2023, becoming both Karol G and Shakira's first number one song on the chart.

Charts

Certifications

Release history

See also 
 List of Billboard Global 200 number ones of 2023
 List of Billboard Hot 100 top-ten singles in 2023
 List of number-one singles of 2023 (Spain)

References 

2023 singles
2023 songs
Billboard Global 200 number-one singles
Billboard Global Excl. U.S. number-one singles
Karol G songs
Number-one singles in Spain
Shakira songs
Song recordings produced by Ovy on the Drums
Songs written by Karol G
Songs written by Shakira
Spanish-language songs
Universal Music Latino singles